Midgard is a fantasy role-playing game from Germany. It was the first role-playing game published in German and the first to be created in Germany.

Midgard is also the name of the world on which the game is usually played (originally named Magira but later renamed due to legal problems). However, the rules of the game are designed in a way that makes it possible to play Midgard on nearly every world.

Game mechanics 
Midgard, in its 1985 edition, was the first role-playing game system that separated exhaustion points from hit points. While the number of exhaustion points increases with the character's level, hit points usually remain constant. This has the effect that experienced characters can fight longer and cast more spells but they may still be inflicted serious wounds by a direct hit.

Midgard uses D20 for attacks, spells and skills. An action succeeds if the sum of the rolled value and the corresponding success score (Erfolgswert, usually +4 to +20) is at least 20. 
The success score depends on the weapon or skill but is the same for all magical spells. Spells, however, cost exhaustion points and differ in the number of points they cost.

For attacks and attack spells, the damage is rolled with D6. The number of dice and the modifier depend on the weapon or spell used for the attack. For example, a dagger may inflict 1D6-1 (roll one D6 and subtract 1) whereas a lance may inflict up to 3D6+3 (roll three D6 and add three, in case of a mounted charge). A damage modifier (ranging from -3 to +5, depending on strength and dexterity) is added to the damage roll.

The attacked player may try to parry or evade by rolling a D20. This is successful if the roll plus the character's defense or resistance score is equal to or larger than the sum achieved by the attacker, and the character only loses exhaustion points (light damage). Otherwise, the character loses both hit and exhaustion points (heavy damage), whereby the number of hit points (but not exhaustion points) lost may be reduced by armour.

D100 are used for tests (Prüfwurf) against the character's attributes (e.g. strength or magical talent), which range from 1 to 100. The player rolls a D100 (usually replaced with two D10) and the test is successful if the roll is below or equal the character's attribute score (Eigenschaftswert).

Compared to Advanced Dungeons and Dragons or The Dark Eye (editions 1, 2 and 3), Midgard (and The Dark Eye editions 4 and 5) does not emphasise the character's level very much. Characters may learn at any time, only limited by their experience points. The level increases when the player has spent a certain number of experience points. They may then spend some more experience points to increase the number of exhaustion points and there's a slight chance (determined by D100) that the score of one of the base attributes increases.

References 
The rule books are only released in German.

Midgard - Der Kodex, Verlag für F&SF-Spiele, 
Midgard - Das Arkanum, Verlag für F&SF-Spiele, 
Midgard - Das Mysterium, Verlag für F&SF-Spiele, 

Fantasy role-playing games
German role-playing games
Role-playing games introduced in 1981